The 1996–97 Sheffield Shield season was the 95th season of the Sheffield Shield, the domestic first-class cricket competition of Australia. Queensland  won the championship.

Table

+0.3 Pts deducted for slow over rate

Final

References

Sheffield Shield
Sheffield Shield
Sheffield Shield seasons